Smith's small-headed sea snake (Hydrophis parviceps) is a marine snake native to waters around the mouth of the Mekong River in Vietnam.

References

Hydrophis]
Reptiles described in 1935